WOWE (98.9 FM), branded as "98.9 The Beat" is a radio station licensed to Vassar, Michigan. The station features an urban contemporary format targeting the Flint and Saginaw markets.  Its studios are in downtown Flint and its transmitter is in Millington, Michigan.

History

WOWE began as a mostly satellite-fed station, airing the syndicated urban-adult "Touch" format from ABC Radio Networks.  In 1999, with the growing popularity of the Rhythmic Oldies format nationwide, WOWE switched to Westwood One's "Groovin' Oldies" format. WOWE stayed with the Rhythmic Oldies format for a time after the "Groovin' Oldies" format was discontinued, but has since evolved back to Urban AC.

On May 17, 2021, WOWE flipped to hip hop, branded as "98.9 The Beat".

Sources
Michiguide.com - WOWE History

External links

OWE-FM
Urban adult contemporary radio stations in the United States